Bohdan Nedilsky (born 23 July 1967 in Chicago, Illinois) is an American former professional soccer player (defender) of Ukrainian descent. In 1991, he played for FC Karpaty Lviv. Bohdan also played for amateur teams Chicago Wings SC and Chicago Levy, and professional club Newark Ukrainian Sitch. He was the head coach of the Shorewood High School boys' soccer team in Shorewood, Wisconsin. He is currently the Co-Founder and Instructional Director of New Horizons for Learning Charter High School for the School District of Shorewood, Wisconsin.  He is married to Aubrey Saia

References

Sources
  Profile at the Footballfacts.u
  Profile at the KLISF

External links
 http://www.bizjournals.com/milwaukee/stories/2009/06/22/focus10.html © 2011 American City Business Journals, Inc.
 https://web.archive.org/web/20110725142804/http://cathedral-center.org/news/news/garden610.shtml ©2011, The Cathedral Center
 http://www.urbanecologycenter.org/pdf/newsletter/2006/jan_feb_006.pdf
 http://football.ua/ownshirt/events/138014.html
 http://aumaubree.com
 http://football.ua/ownshirt/events/138014-kapytan-ameryka.html
 https://football24.ua/koli_priyihav_do_lvova_to_pochuvav_sebe_nache_olen_u_svitli_far_yak_pershiy_amerikanets_v_istoriyi_ukrayinskogo_futbolu_grav_za_karpati_n391006/?fshare
 
 http://ukrweekly.com/archive/1985/The_Ukrainian_Weekly_1985-12.pdf
 http://www.ukrweekly.com/archive/1987/The_Ukrainian_Weekly_1987-22.pdf
 http://ukrweekly.com/archive/1991/The_Ukrainian_Weekly_1991-16.pdf

1967 births
Living people
FC Karpaty Lviv players
American soccer players
American soccer coaches
American people of Ukrainian descent
Association footballers not categorized by position